Ernest John Henry Mackay (5 July 1880 – 2 October 1943) was a British archeologist from Bristol known for his excavations and studies of Mohenjo-daro and other sites belonging to the Indus Valley civilisation.

Early life
Ernest John Henry Mackay was from Bristol and attended Bristol Grammar School and Bristol University securing BA, MA and DLitt. He married Dorothy Mary Simmons in 1912, who was an anthropologist and they had one son. Between 1907 and 1912 Mackay carried out archaeological excavations in Egypt and then spent three years on a photographic survey of the Theban Tombs.

During the First World War Mackay served as a captain in the Royal Army Medical Corps in Egypt and Palestine with the Imperial Camel Corps, in 1919 he was a member of an Army Commission for the survey of ancient monuments in Palestine and Syria. From 1919 to 1922 he was Custodian of Antiquities for the Palestine government.

Indus valley civilization
Mackay is well known for his excavations at Mohenjo-daro which was at its peak between 2500 BC and 1900 BC. He did major excavations at this site from 1926 to 1931 and published detailed site report during 1936-37, which was published during 1942. He also did planning of excavation of Chanhudaro, along with W.Norman Brown and visited Chanhudaro in 1935-36 along with his wife.

Books published
 Chanhu-daro excavation, 1935-36. Pub. June 1942
 Indus Civilisation
 City of Shepherd Kings and Ancient Gaza V (British School Archaeology in Egypt). With W.M.Flinders Petrie
Further Excavations At Mohenjo-daro

Article

References

External links

1880 births
1943 deaths
English archaeologists
Royal Army Medical Corps officers
Scientists from Bristol
People educated at Bristol Grammar School
Fellows of the Society of Antiquaries of London
Alumni of the University of Bristol
British Army personnel of World War I
Administrators of Palestine